Princess Louise may refer to:

People

 Princess Louise, Duchess of Argyll, 1848–1939, the sixth child and fourth daughter of Queen Victoria of the United Kingdom 
 Princess Louise, Princess Royal and Duchess of Fife, 1867–1931, the third child and the eldest daughter of Edward VII and Queen Alexandra
 Princess Louise of Denmark (1726–1756), daughter of Christian VI of Denmark and wife of Ernest Frederick III, Duke of Saxe-Hildburghausen
 Princess Louise of Denmark (1750–1831), daughter of Frederick V of Denmark and wife of Landgrave Charles of Hesse-Kassel
 Princess Louise Charlotte of Denmark (1750–1831), daughter of Frederick, Hereditary Prince of Denmark, and wife of Landgrave William of Hesse-Kassel
 Princess Louise Auguste of Denmark (1771–1843), daughter of Christian VII of Denmark and wife of Frederick Christian II, Duke of Schleswig-Holstein-Sonderburg-Augustenburg
 Princess Louise of Denmark (1875–1906), daughter of Frederick VIII of Denmark and wife of Prince Friedrich Georg of Schaumburg-Lippe
 Louisa Maria Teresa Stuart (1682–1712), known in French as Louise-Marie
 Princess Louise of Belgium, born 1858
 Princess Louise of Belgium (b. 2004)
 Lady Louise Windsor (b. 2003), granddaughter of Queen Elizabeth II of the United Kingdom and the Commonwealth and daughter of the Duke, and Duchess of Edinburgh.
 Louise Mountbatten, 1889–1965, born Princess Louise of Battenberg, second wife of King Gustav VI Adolf of Sweden and Princess of Sweden
 See Louise of Prussia (disambiguation) for several Princess Louise in the Prussian Royal Family

Other uses
 Princess Louise was one of the GWR 3031 Class locomotives that were built for and run on the Great Western Railway between 1891 and 1915
 Princess Louise (sidewheeler), a sidewheel steamboat built in 1869
 SS Princess Louise (1921), a luxury cruise ship built in 1921, later converted into a floating restaurant
 Lady Alexandra, also converted to a floating restaurant, and renamed Princess Louise II after the original vessel
 Princess Louise, Holborn, historic public house, London

Louise